is a Japanese singer and former model. She was a member of the Japanese idol girl group ZYX and Cute up until departing to pursue a solo career in modeling. In 2013, she returned to her music career with the release of her debut solo single "Crush On You."

Career

2002–2004: Hello! Project Kids and ZYX
Umeda was born in Minami-ku, Yokohama, Japan. In 2002, she auditioned for Hello! Project Kids with the song "White Love" by Speed. Her audition tape was aired on Morning Musume's variety show Hello! Morning. She was placed in the group with 14 other girls. In the same year, she appeared in the movie Koinu Dan no Monogatari.

In 2003, Umeda became a member of the subgroup ZYX along with Mari Yaguchi from Morning Musume, Maimi Yajima, Saki Shimizu, Megumi Murakami, and Momoko Tsugunaga. They released their debut single, "Iku ZYX! Fly High" on August 6, 2003, followed by "Shiroi Tokyo" on December 10, 2003. Later, in 2004, she participated in singing "All for One & One for All!", a collaboration single released by all Hello! Project artists under the name "H.P. All Stars."

2005–2009: Cute

In 2004, Berryz Kobo was created with the intention of rotating all of the members of Hello! Project Kids to make time for school, but the idea was later scrapped, and the remaining girls who were not chosen were rebranded under the name Cute on June 11, 2005. On August 1, 2009, Hello! Project announced that Umeda was graduating from the company on October 25, 2009, the last day of Cute's concert tour, to become a fashion model.

2010–present: Solo career
In 2010, Umeda was signed into a model agency called Illume Models. She made her runaway debut in Girls Award Summer 2010 and continued to appear as a regular model at every seasonal show until 2013. She also appeared at the Tokyo Girls Collection Spring/Summer 2012 show.

In 2013, Umeda left modeling to return to music and signed with Brand-New Music. She released her first solo album Erika on February 12, 2014, with the lead single "Crush On You." In 2018, she became the advisor for the girl group Turtle Lily.

Personal life

On August 15, 2021, Umeda announced on her blog and Instagram account that she had married Hirokasu Goto, a radio personality from Niigata Prefecture, and that she was pregnant with their first child. Their little boy was born on January 1, 2022.

Discography

Albums

Filmography

Film

Television

Music video

Theater

Radio

References

External links 
 Erika's Sweet Diary - Erika Umeda Official Blog 

1991 births
Living people
People from Yokohama
Cute (Japanese idol group) members
ZYX (pop group) members
Hello! Project Kids members
Japanese female models
Musicians from Kanagawa Prefecture
21st-century Japanese singers